The 2019 Beijing Renhe F.C. season is Beijing Renhe's 2nd consecutive season in the Chinese Super League ever since it started back in the 2004 season and 2nd consecutive season in the top flight of Chinese football. This season Beijing Renhe participates in the Chinese Super League and Chinese FA Cup.

Transfers

Winter

In:

Out:

Squad
As of 1 March 2019

Reserve squad
As of 1 March 2019

Competitions

Chinese Super League

Table

Results summary

Results by round

Matches

Source:

Chinese FA Cup

Squad statistics

Appearances and goals

|-
|colspan="14"|Players who appeared for Beijing Renhe but left during the season:
|}

Goal scorers

Disciplinary Record

References

Beijing Renhe F.C. seasons
Beijing Renhe F.C.